Midida Hrudayagalu is a 1993 Indian Kannada-language romantic drama film, directed by A. T. Raghu and written by Shantharaj. The film stars Ambareesh, Shruti and Nirosha. The film is regarded as one of more popular movies of Shruti. The film is a remake of the 1982 Tamil movie Enkeyo Ketta Kural.

Cast 

 Ambareesh as rajanna
 Shruti as Kaveri
 Nirosha as Sampige
 Doddanna
 Rockline Venkatesh
 Lohitashwa
 Ramesh Bhat as Muddukrishna
 Sadashiva Brahmavar as Jamindar
 Agro Chikkanna
 Girija Lokesh

Soundtrack 
The music of the film was composed and lyrics written by Hamsalekha. Audio was released on Lahari Music. The song "Tande Kodiso Seere" is a popular for its lyrics lucidly expressing emotional bonds between husband and wife.

References

External links 

 Midida Hrudayagalu at FlipKart

1993 films
1990s Kannada-language films
Indian romance films
Films scored by Hamsalekha
1990s romance films